Pentakis(dimethylamido)tantalum is an organometallic compound of tantalum.  It is a colorless solid that is soluble in organic solvents.  It hydrolyzes readily to release dimethylamine.

Synthesis and structure
Ta(NMe2)5 is prepared by treating TaCl5 with lithium dimethylamide. The preparation is similar to that for tetrakis(dimethylamido)titanium.

The compound has idealized D3h symmetry (ignoring the organic substituents).

Applications to organic synthesis

The complex effects C-alkylation of secondary amines with 1-alkenes  and hydroaminoalkylation of olefins to form alkylamines.

References

Tantalum compounds
Metal amides